Alexander Borisovich Zhurbin (Алекса́ндр Бори́сович Журби́н; born in Tashkent, Uzbekistan on 7 August 1945) is a Russian composer.

Biography
Alexander Borisovich Zhurbin was born in Tashkent. In 1963, he graduated from Special Music School and in 1969, he graduated from Tashkent Conservatory and Gnessin Music College as a cellist and a composer respectively. He subsequently undertook his postgraduate studies as a musicologist in Leningrad, where he completed his PhD dissertation (1973) on Gustav Mahler's Symphonies.

His first big success came in 1975, with his rock-opera "Orpheus and Eurydice". This work was the first of its kind in the Soviet Union and achieved great popularity. It was performed more than two thousand times in a row, and more than two million copies of the record were sold. For this opera, Mr. Zhurbin won many international awards, including "Star of the Year", in Great Britain.

He has scored more than 50 feature movies, some of them well known internationally.

His 6 operas and 3 ballets were performed in leading Russian theaters (Leningrad National Opera, Moscow Chamber Opera).

All of his sixteen musicals are still playing in the former Soviet Union, and some of them have had more than 2,000 performances.

Since 1990, the composer and his family live in New York City. He served as a composer-in residence at the 92nd Street "Y" and a professor at Touro college. In 1992 he founded the Russian-American Theater "Wandering Stars", which became a major cultural force inside the Russian-speaking community, which produced nine large-scale theatrical productions, six of them with the music of Alexander Zhurbin.

His musical "How It Was Done in Odessa", was a critical success at the Walnut Street Theatre, Philadelphia. It had an eight-week "sold-out" run with a very good reviews. (1991)

Among his compositions written in the USA are Cello Concerto, Violin Concerto, Symphony # 3, an opera.

"Good Health, Your majesty", a cantata "A Part of Speech" with lyrics by Joseph Brodsky, as well as songs, jingles and commercials.

In 1996, he had a very successful "Evening of Zhurbin's Music" in Carnegie Hall (Weill Recital Hall) performed by Kristjan Järvi and the Absolute Ensemble.
His latest theater works are musicals "Shalom, America" (after Sholom Asch), "Camera Obscura" (after Vladimir Nabokov), "Wandering Stars" (after Sholom Aleikhem).

Presently, he is predominantly living in Moscow, and traveling all over the world. He has written several major theatrical works: "Mousetrap" (musical after Agatha Christie), Humiliated and Insulted (opera after Dostoevsky) "The Seagull"– operetta after Anton Chekhov and many others. All of them were produced in Moscow, Saint-Petersburg and another cities. Also he scored the miniseries "Moscow Saga" based on the novel by Vasily Aksyonov.

In 2015, there was an extended (2.5 month-long) festival of Zhurbin's works, which spanned almost every musical scene (opera, musical, symphony, rock, film), performances of his first four symphonies and including the premiere of his Fifth Symphony ("Speak, Memory!"),  as well as the premiere of Zhurbin's opera "Melkiy Bes" (Petty Demon) based on Sologub.

A premiere of his new opera "Love's Metamorphosis" premiered May 2017 at the Moscow Musical Theater Nemirovich-Danchenko.

In the 2020-2021 season, the festival "Serious and Light", commemorating the composer's 75th birthday, ran from September 2020 to February 2021. Many works were performed during the festival, including the premieres of operas "Anna K." and "Happy Day", the premiere of Zhurbin's Sixth Symphony ("Con Programma Letterale") and a number of vocal and chamber music works.

Personal life
He is married to the poet, translator and writer Irina Ginzburg. His son, Lev Zhurbin, is a composer and performer, living in New York.

List of Works

Symphonic and Chamber Works
Op. 1 – Quartet No. 1
Op. 2 – "Cactus" – a folk tale for low voice and piano, text by V. Sosnora
Op. 3 – Three Romances for medium voice & piano
Op. 4 – "Fall of 1942" for voice and piano, text by A. Faynberg
Op. 5 – Romance "Music" for high voice and piano, text by William Shakespeare.
Op. 6 – Suite for piano.
Op. 7 – Suite for flute, oboe, clarinet & bassoon.
Op. 8 – Sonatina for viola and piano
Op. 9 – Cantata "Russia, year 1111" for choir, soloists and orchestra, text by V. Sosnora
Op. 10 – Song Cycle "Seven Soldier Songs" for baritone and piano.
Op. 11 – Concertino for Oboe and String Orchestra
Op. 12 -- "Children's Games", suite for string orchestra.
Op. 13 – "In Memory of the Heroes", fantasy for large orchestra.
Op. 14 – "Chorale and Allegro" for bayan
Op. 15 – "Wooden Fair" – Romance for high voice, text by Rudolf Barinsky
Op. 16 – Song Cycle "A Poet's Love", based on poems of R. M. Rilke, translated by T. Silman
Op. 17 – "Improvisation and Toccata" for violin and piano
Op. 18 – Sonata for piano
Op. 19 – "Polyphonic Suite" for three flutes
Op. 20 – Quartet No. 2
Op. 21 – "Three Picasso Drawings"
Op. 22 – "Prelude, Gavotte and Scherzo" for bayan/accordion
Op. 23 – "Poeme" for French Horn and piano
Op. 24 – "Polyphonic Partita" for string Quartet
Op. 25 – "The Ratcatcher" Cantata, poems by M. Tsvetaeva
Op. 26 – Symphony No. 1 "Sinfonia Concertante" (four movements)
Op. 27 -- "Toccata" for bayan
Op. 28 – Sonata for Double Bass and Piano
Op. 29 – "Meeting with Lenin" – Symphonic-Choral Poem
Op. 30 – Three Sonatas for Bayan
Op. 31 – Symphony No. 2 "Sinfonia Giocosa"
Op. 32 – Concerto for Viola and Orchestra
Op. 33 – Songs for Children, texts by V. Suslov & M.Raykin
Op. 34 – Song Cycle "From German Folk Poetry"
Op. 35 – "The People's Earth" – oratorio
Op. 36 – "Winter Songs" – six duets for mezzo-soprano and baritone, texts by Russian poets
Op. 37 – "Fantasy and Fugue" for bayan
Op. 38 – "Two Friends" – Poem for Orchestra and Vocalists, texts by A. Tvardovsky and R. Gamzatov
Op. 39 – "Velimir" – four songs on poems by V. Khlebnikov
Op. 40 – "Five Poems by Konstantin Batyushkov" – for mezzo-soprano, flute, horn and harp.
Op. 41 – Concerto for Piano and Orchestra (3
Op. 42 – Sonata for Cello and Piano
Op. 43 – Piano Quintet
Op. 44 – "Mashkerad", for choir a capella, texts by A. Sumarokov
Op. 45 – "Marina" – seven songs, poems by M. Tsvetaeva
Op. 46 – "Dithyrambe" for cello and chamber ensemble
Op. 47 – "Three Muses" – suite for viola, double–bass and harpsichord
Op. 48 – Concerto for Cello and Orchestra
Op. 49 – Symphony No. 3 "Sinfonia Romantica"
Op. 50 – "Part of Speech" – Cantata for Choir, poems by J. Brodsky in English & Russian
Op. 51 – "Three Madrigals", poems by W. Shakespeare
Op. 52 – Concerto for Violin and Orchestra
Op. 53/1 "Musica Drammatica" for string orchestra.
Op. 54/20 – "Musica Piccola" for string orchestra
Op. 55/24 – "Musica polyphonica" for string orchestra
Op. 56 – "The Poet" – song cycle, poems by M. Tsvetaeva
Op. 57 – Symphony No. 4, "Sinfonia Tragica" / "City of The Plague" for soloists, mixed choir and large orchestra, in nine movements.
Op. 58 – Symphony No. 5 "Sinfonia bizzarra" ("Speak, Memory!") – for large orchestra and four soloists (violin, viola, cello and piano), in fifteen movements.
Op. 59 – "Love" – song cycle, poems by M. Tsvetaeva and O. Mandelshtam
Symphony No. 6 "Sinfonia con programma letterale" (2020)

References

External links
Alexander Zhurbin's Official Website

1945 births
20th-century classical composers
21st-century classical composers
American people of Russian descent
Gnessin State Musical College alumni
Living people
Musicians from Tashkent
Recipients of the Order of Honour (Russia)
Russian male classical composers
20th-century Russian male musicians
21st-century Russian male musicians
Male musical theatre composers